Events from the year 1907 in art involved some significant events.


Events
 February 7 – Vanessa Stephen marries Clive Bell.
 September – A cast of G. F. Watts' sculpture Physical Energy is erected posthumously in Kensington Gardens in London.
 Henri Matisse begins to teach at the Académie Matisse in Paris, a private and non-commercial art school.
 Adolphe Valette joins the staff of Manchester Municipal School of Art.
 Kunsthalle Mannheim designed by Hermann Billing to serve an International Art Exhibition.
 The Chicago Plan is produced by Daniel Burnham and Edward H. Bennett, and illustrated by Jules Guerin.
 Bernard Berenson publishes North Italian Painters of the Renaissance.
 Cadmium Red pigment first produced, in Germany.

Exhibitions
 October 1–27 – Salon d'Automne, Paris. Georges Braque exhibits Viaduc à l'Estaque, a proto-Cubist work which later enters the Minneapolis Institute of Arts. Simultaneously, there is a retrospective exhibition of 56 works by Paul Cézanne as a tribute to the artist who died in 1906.

Works

 Vladimir Baranov-Rossine – Self-portrait
 George Bellows – Pennsylvania Station Excavation
 Karl Bitter – Monument to General Sigel
Solon Borglum – Statue of John Brown Gordon
 Mikalojus Konstantinas Čiurlionis
 Winter cycle (completed)
 Sonata of the Spring
 Sonata of the Sun
 Zodiac cycle
 Robert Delaunay – Paysage au disque
 Lyonel Feininger – Der weiße Mann
 Gustaf Fjæstad – Winter Evening by a River
 Stanhope Forbes – After a Day's Work
 J. W. Godward – The Love Letter
 Ivan Grohar – The Sower
 Bernhard Hoetger – Tomb of Paula Modersohn-Becker in Worpswede churchyard
 Adrian Jones – Equestrian statue of the Duke of Cambridge, Whitehall (London)
 Wassily Kandinsky – Riding Couple
 Ernst Ludwig Kirchner – Sitting Woman (Dodo)
 Gustav Klimt
 Danaë
 Hope II
 The Kiss
 Portrait of Adele Bloch-Bauer I
 The Sunflower
 Wilhelm Lehmbruck – Sleep (sculpture)
 Jacek Malczewski – Bacchante
 Henri Matisse
 Blue Nude (Souvenir de Biskra)
 Madras Rouge
 Jean Metzinger
 Paysage coloré aux oiseaux aquatique
 Les Ibis
 Le Flamant rose et le voilier
 Claude Monet – Water Lilies, Giverny #3
 Edvard Munch
 Death of Marat I and II
 Jealousy
 The Sick Child (3rd and 4th painted versions)
 Mikhail Nesterov – Tolstoy on the shore of the pond at Yasnaya Polyana
 Pablo Picasso – Les Demoiselles d'Avignon
 Henri Rousseau – The Snake Charmer
 John Singer Sargent
 Alpine Pool
 Lady Speyer
 Walter Sickert – The Juvenile Lead: Self-portrait
 Charles Sims – The Fountain
 Alfred Stieglitz – The Steerage (photograph)
 Vardges Sureniants – Salomé
 Félix Vallotton
 Portrait of Gertrude Stein
 Three Women and a Little Girl Playing in the Water
 J. W. Waterhouse – Jason and Medea
 Mahonri Young – Statues of Joseph and Hyrum Smith
 Arnoldo Zocchi – Monument to the Tsar Liberator (Sofia)

Movements
 Cubism begins to take root

Exhibitions
 First Exhibition of Lithuanian Art, Vilnius

Births

January to June
 January 13 – Jon Gnagy, American painter, illustrator and television art instructor (d. 1981)
 February 4 – James McIntosh Patrick, Scottish landscape painter (d. 1998)
 February 28 – Milton Caniff, American cartoonist (d. 1988)
 March 10 – Toni Frissell, American photographer (d. 1988)
 March 23 – Abidin Dino, Turkish-born painter (d. 1993)
 April 23
 Lee Miller, American photographer (d. 1977)
 Fritz Wotruba, Austrian sculptor (d. 1975)
 May 1 – Theodore Roszak, Polish-American sculptor and painter (d. 1981)
 May 10 – Lenore Tawney, American fiber artist (d. 2007)
 May 22 – Hergé, Belgian comics writer and artist (d. 1983)
 June 6 – George Rickey, American kinetic sculptor (d. 2002)
 June 10 – Fairfield Porter, American painter (d. 1975)
 June 14 – Nicolas Bentley, English author and illustrator (d. 1978)

July to December
 July 1 – Ilya Bolotowsky, Russian-born American painter (d. 1981)
 July 6 – Frida Kahlo, Mexican painter (d. 1954)
 July 15 – Seamus Murphy, Irish sculptor (d. 1975)
 July 27 – Petar Lubarda, Serbian painter (d. 1974)
 August 5 – Robert George Irwin, American sculptor and spree killer (d. 1975)
 August 7 – Albert Kotin, Russian-born American Abstract Expressionist artist (d. 1980)
 August 17 – Acee Blue Eagle, Native American painter and muralist (d. 1959)
 August 30 – Leonor Fini, Argentinian surrealist painter (d. 1996)
 September 4
 Leo Castelli, Italian-American art dealer and gallerist (d. 1999)
 Zhang Chongren, Chinese artist and sculptor (d. 1998)
 September 26 – Anthony Blunt, English art historian (d. 1983)
 October 5 – Jean Louis, French costume designer (d. 1997)
 October 8 – Art Babbitt, American animator (d. 1992)
 October 21 – Nikos Engonopoulos, Greek painter and poet (d. 1985)
 November 1 – Terence Cuneo, English railway and military painter (d. 1996)
 November 4 – Henry Heerup, Danish painter and sculptor (d. 1993)
 November 14 – William Steig, American cartoonist, sculptor and author (d. 2003)
 November 22 – Dora Maar, French photographer, poet and painter, lover of Pablo Picasso (d. 1997)
 November 28 – Charles Alston, American artist, muralist and teacher (d. 1977).

Full date unknown
 Marie Z. Chino, potter and ceramic artist (d. 1982)
 Art Frahm, American pin-up and advertising artist (d. 1981)

Deaths
 January 8 – Theodoor Verstraete, Belgian rural realist painter and printmaker (born 1850)
 February 5 – Paula Modersohn-Becker, German painter (b. 1876)
 February 11 – Christen Dalsgaard, Danish painter (born 1824)
 February 14 – Adolf Seel, German painter (born 1829)
 March 26 – Ettore Roesler Franz, Italian painter (born 1845)
 April 14 – James Clarke Hook, marine and historical painter (born 1819) 
 May 5 – Şeker Ahmet Paşa, Turkish military painter (born 1841)
 May 11 – Edward Kemeys, American sculptor (born 1843)
 May 18 – Bernhard Plockhorst, German painter and graphic artist (born 1825)
 June 14 – Giuseppe Pellizza da Volpedo, Italian neo-impressionist painter (born 1868)
 July 16 – Théobald Chartran, French propaganda painter (born 1849)
 August 3 – Augustus Saint-Gaudens, American Beaux-Arts sculptor (born 1848)
 October 4 – Alfredo Keil, Portuguese romantic composer and painter (born 1850)
 October 30 – Đorđe Krstić, Serbian Realist painter (born 1851)
 November 10 – Alexander Zick, German painter and illustrator (born 1845)
 November 21
 Paula Modersohn-Becker, German Expressionist painter (born 1876; embolism)
 Balduin Wolff, German painter and chess player (born 1819)
 November 23 – John F. Peto, American trompe-l'œil painter (born 1854)
 November 26 - Mario Raggi, Italian sculptor (born 1821)
 November 27 – Paul Ritter, German architectural painter (born 1829)
 November 28 – Stanisław Wyspiański, Polish dramatist, painter and designer (born 1869)

References

 
Years of the 20th century in art
1900s in art